Dickleburgh is a village and former civil parish, now in the parish of Dickleburgh and Rushall, in the South Norfolk district of the English county of Norfolk. The village is located 3.5 miles east of Diss and 17 miles south-west of Norwich. In 2021 it had a population of 1166.

History
Dickleburgh is situated upon what was once Pye Road, the Roman road that ran from Venta Icenorum, near Caistor St. Edmund, to Camulodunum.

Dickleburgh's name is of Anglo-Saxon origin and derives from the Old English for 'Dicle's' or 'Dicla's' fortification.

In the Domesday Book, Dickleburgh is listed as a settlement of 22 households in the hundred of Diss. In 1086, the village was part of the estates of Bury St Edmunds Abbey.

In 1780, Dickleburgh Mill opened which was turned into one of Britain's first steam-powered mills in 1834. The mill continued to expand throughout the Nineteenth and Twentieth Centuries, generating its own electricity and providing subsidised housing for employees in the village. The mill closed in 1988 with the land being bought by Wimpey Homes for residential redevelopment.

Civil parish 
On 1 April 1936 the parish of Rushall was merged with Dickleburgh on 21 January 1980 the parish was renamed "Dickleburgh & Rushall". In 1931 the parish of Dickleburgh (prior to the merge) had a population of 679.

Geography
According to the 2011 Census, the ward of Dickleburgh had a population of 2,814 residents living in 1,221 households.

Dickleburgh falls within the constituency of South Norfolk and is represented at Parliament by Richard Bacon MP of the Conservative Party.

All Saints' Church
Dickleburgh's parish church dates largely to the Fifteenth Century with the tower dating to an earlier period, the church also features examples of stained glass installed by Hardman & Co..

Amenities
Dickleburgh has a public house, The Crown, a village shop with post office, plus a fish and chip shop.

Village groups include the Friends of Dickleburgh School, The Village Society and The Luncheon Club. 

Dickleburgh Bowls Club compete in three local leagues with Dickleburgh Football Club no longer in operation.

The majority of local children attend Dickleburgh Church of England Primary School, which holds an 'Outstanding' rating from Ofsted. The majority of children attend Diss High School for secondary education.

Notable Residents
 Bob Flowerdew- British gardener and radio presenter
 George Cattermole- British painter and illustrator

References

External links

 
Villages in Norfolk
Former civil parishes in Norfolk
South Norfolk